The Turkmenistan women's national football team represents Turkmenistan in international women's football. Their first international match was against Kazakhstan on 24 February 2019 as preparation for their participation in the 2019 Turkish Women's Cup, which they lost 6–0.

Results and fixtures

The following is a list of match results in the last 12 months, as well as any future matches that have been scheduled.

Legend

2022

2023

Coaching staff

Current coaching staff

Manager history

Players

Current squad
The following 23 players are included in the squad for the 2022 CAFA Women's Championship held in Tajikistan.

Recent call-ups
The following players have been called up to the squad in the past 12 months.

Records

*Players in bold are still active, at least at club level.

Most capped players

Top goalscorers

Competitive record

FIFA Women's World Cup

*Draws include knockout matches decided on penalty kicks.

Olympic Games

*Draws include knockout matches decided on penalty kicks.

AFC Women's Asian Cup

*Draws include knockout matches decided on penalty kicks.

CAFA Women's Championship

Turkish Women's Cup

See also

Sport in Turkmenistan
Football in Turkmenistan
Women's football in Turkmenistan
Turkmenistan men's national football team

References

External links
 Official website

Women
Asian women's national association football teams